The Baie de Bouéni is a large bay in the south-west of the French island territory of Mayotte, in the Comoro Islands lying at the northern end of the Mozambique Channel between the East African country of Mozambique and Madagascar. It is about 5 km wide at its mouth, and 10 km in length. It was made a protected area in 2007.

Important Bird Area
The coastal fringe of the bay holds the largest area of mangroves in the Comoro archipelago. It forms a strip about 13 km long and up to 800 m wide. It has been identified as an Important Bird Area (IBA) by BirdLife International because its mangroves and intertidal mudflats support populations of Malagasy pond herons, Mayotte drongos, Mayotte white-eyes, Mayotte sunbirds and red-headed fodies. It is also home to the endangered and endemic Robert Mertens's day gecko.

References

Bodies of water of Mayotte
Bays of the Indian Ocean
Important Bird Areas of Mayotte
Protected areas of Mayotte
2007 establishments in Mayotte